The National Cathedral of Ghana is a planned interdenominational Christian cathedral scheduled to be built in Accra, the nation's capital, as part of Ghana's 60th anniversary celebrations. The design for the cathedral was unveiled by the President of Ghana, Nana Akufo-Addo, in March 2018.

Design
The cathedral will have an auditorium capable of seating 5,000 as well as the requisite chapels, and a baptistery. The site will also house a music school, an art gallery, and a museum dedicated to the Bible.

The design of the cathedral reflects the art and culture of Ghanaian ethnic groups; the high pitched and staggered roof is reminiscent of Akan inspired architecture and the façade will be concave and decorated with timber in imitation of Ashanti royal stools. The architect for the project is the British-Ghanaian architect David Adjaye, who also designed the Smithsonian National Museum of African American History and Culture.

Reception and debate
In an opinion piece for The New York Times, art historian Chika Okeke-Agulu wrote that the cathedral "...signals that the country is poised to consolidate the gains of decades of democracy," adding that it would "inspire ambitious civic architecture projects across the continent that harness the talents of Africa's emerging artists[.] This Accra commission is not just a recognition by his homeland of Mr. Adjaye acclaim. It also signifies that Africa can build a major work by a leading architect at the top of his game."

A 2018 article from the Financial Times covered the backlash within Ghana coming from those who saw the $100 million project as a "white elephant" and a low priority. Yaw Nsarkoh, executive vice president of Unilever for Ghana and Nigeria, was quoted as saying "At a time when taxes are going up, banks have collapsed and you can't pay for social programmes, is it really the thing to do to build a cathedral?" Other figures disagreed, such as Edward Effah, chairman of Ghana's largest bank, who said "You can't say: 'Until we are wealthy, we cannot afford national pride'", to rebut these concerns. 

A 2022 article in Bloomberg News noted that the cathedral's original price tag of $100 million had quadrupled amid record inflation and the devaluation of cedi in 2022. By 2022, the Ghanaian government had spent over $58 million on the cathedral, with about half of it going to Adjaye's architecture firm.

References

External links
Official National Cathedral of Ghana site
Renders of the proposed cathedral at Dezeen

Presidency of Nana Akufo-Addo
Cathedrals in Ghana
Churches in Accra
Proposed buildings and structures in Ghana
David Adjaye buildings